The Chelmsford Forum is a multi-use indoor sport and concert venue, actually located in  Billerica, Massachusetts, United States, just across the town line of Chelmsford, Massachusetts. The venue was formerly home to the UMass Lowell River Hawks, during which time the team won two NCAA Division II national championships (1981 and 1982). It is also home to the ice hockey team from Chelmsford High School. The rink is owned by the town of Chelmsford, but currently managed by Valley Rinks, having previously been managed by FMC Ice Sports (1997-2018).

The arena was formerly named for state senator B. Joseph Tully.

References

External links
 Paul Tsongas Arena website History

1964 establishments in Massachusetts
Buildings and structures in Billerica, Massachusetts
Defunct college ice hockey venues in the United States
Indoor ice hockey venues in Massachusetts
Sports venues in Middlesex County, Massachusetts
Sports venues completed in 1964
UMass Lowell River Hawks men's ice hockey